The Olympic Gymnastics Arena, also known as the KSPO Dome since 2018, is an indoor arena located within the Olympic Park in Seoul, South Korea. It has a capacity of 15,000.

It was constructed between 31 August 1984 and 30 April 1986, to host the gymnastics competitions at the 1988 Summer Olympics. The roof was designed by David H. Geiger. It is a self-supporting cable dome – the first of its kind ever built – with a four-layer fabric cladding.

History
Since the Olympics it has hosted a variety of events, notably as a concert venue for both South Korean and international artists.

The arena is also infamous due to an incident in early 1992 when American boy band New Kids on the Block abruptly halted their performance after 20 minutes due to a fatal human crush incident where female Korean teenagers swarmed the band to the stage. One person was killed and about 50 people treated for injuries.

Events

Before 2011
 Namie Amuro: So Crazy Tour Featuring Best Singles 2003–2004 – 13, 14 and 15 May 2004
 1st Asia Song Festival, organised by Korea Foundation for International Culture Exchange, in 2004
 Shinhwa: State of the Art Tour 2006 – 13 and 14 May 2006
 Christina Aguilera: Back to Basics Tour – 23 and 24 June 2007. Opening acts: Ivy (day 1) and Lee Min-woo (day 2)
 SM Town: 2007 SM Town Summer Concert – 30 June – 1 July 2007
 Beyoncé: The Beyoncé Experience – 9 and 10 November 2007
 Celine Dion: Taking Chances World Tour – 18 and 19 March 2008
 Shinhwa: Shinhwa Must Go On: 10th Anniversary Live in Seoul – 29 and 30 March 2008
 Duran Duran: Red Carpet Massacre Tour – 17 April 2008
 Billy Joel: Billy Joel Live in Seoul 2008 – 15 November 2008
 Rain: The Legend of Rainism – 9 and 10 October 2009
 Beyoncé: I Am... World Tour – 20 and 21 October 2009
 Guns N' Roses: Chinese Democracy Tour – 13 December 2009
 Whitney Houston: Nothing but Love World Tour – 6 and 7 February 2010
 SS501: Persona – 27 February 2010
 Super Junior: Super Show 3 – 14 and 15 August 2010

2011
 Shinee: Shinee World – 1 and 2 January
 Taylor Swift: Speak Now World Tour – February 11 
 Santana: 9 March
 The Eagles: Long Road Out of Eden Tour – 15 March
Girls' Generation: 2011 Girls' Generation Tour – 23 and 24 July
 Super Junior: "Super Show 4 World Tour" – 19 and 20 November
 YG Family: YG Family Concert – 3 and 4 December
 Lee Seung-gi: Hope Concert 2011 – 10 and 11 December

2012
 21st Seoul Music Awards – 19 January
 Beast: Beautiful Show – 4 and 5 February
 Kara: 2012 The 1st Concert Karasia in Seoul – 18 and 19 February
 Big Bang: Alive Galaxy Tour – 2, 3 and 4 March
 Shinhwa: 2012 Shinhwa Grand Tour in Seoul: The Return – 24 and 25 March
 Super Junior: "Super Show 4 World Tour" Encore – 26 and 27 May
 Shinee: Shinee World II – 21 and 22 July
 2NE1: New Evolution World Tour – 28 and 29 July
 TVXQ: Catch Me: Live World Tour – 17 and 18 November
 Elton John: 40th Anniversary of the Rocket Man – 27 November
 Lee Seung-gi: Hope Concert 2012 – 1 and 2 December
 Sting: Back to Bass Tour – 5 December

2013
 Big Bang: Alive Galaxy Tour Final – 25, 26 and 27 January
 10cm: Fine Thank You and You? – 23 February
 Shinhwa: 2013 Shinhwa 15th Anniversary Concert: The Legend Continues – 16 and 17 March
 Super Junior: Super Show 5 World Tour – 23 and 24 March
 G-Dragon: One of a Kind World Tour – 30 and 31 March
 Sigur Rós: Sigur Rós World Tour 2013 – 19 May
 Girls' Generation: Girls & Peace World Tour – 8 and 9 June 
 Beast: 2013 Beautiful Show – 20 and 21 July
 Shinhwa: 2013 Shinhwa Grand Tour in Seoul: The Classic – 3 and 4 August (finale shows)
 Infinite: One Great Step – 9 and 10 August
 VIXX: The Milky Way Global Showcase Finale In Seoul – 17 November

2014
 Beast: 2014 Beautiful Show – 16 and 17 August

2015
 24th Seoul Music Awards – 22 January
 Beast: 2015 Beautiful Show – 29 and 30 August
Girls' Generation: Phantasia – 21 and 22 November
 UFC Fight Night: Henderson vs. Masvidal – 28 November

2016
 25th Seoul Music Awards – 14 January
 BTS: 2016 BTS Live the Most Beautiful Moment in Life on Stage: Epilogue – 7 and 8 May
 Sechs Kies: Yellow Note – 10 and 11 September

2018
 Shinee: Shinee Special Party – The Shining – 1, and 2 September 
 BTOB: 2018 BtoB Time – This Is Us – 10, 11 and 12 August
 iKon: iKon 2018 Continue Tour – 18 August
 2nd Soribada Best K-Music Awards – 30 August
Seventeen: 2018 Seventeen Concert 'Ideal Cut: The Final Scene' – 3 and 4 November
 Blackpink: Blackpink World Tour "In Your Area" Seoul Concert 2018 – 10 and 11 November
IU: 2018 IU 10th Anniversary Tour Concert – 17 and 18 November
 Highlight: Highlight Live 2018 [Outro] – 24 and 25 November

2019
 NCT 127: NCT 127 1st Tour: Neo City – The Origin – 26 and 27 January
 Super Junior: Super Show 7 in Seoul – 2 and 3 March
 NU'EST: NU'EST 2019 Concert: Segno in Seoul – 12, 13 and 14 April
 Twice: Twice World Tour 2019 "Twicelights" – 25 and 26 May
 Got7: Got World Tour 2019 "Keep Spinning" – 15 and 16 June
 BTS: BTS 5th Muster  –  22 and 23 June
 2nd Genie Music Awards – 1 August
 3rd Soribada Best K-Music Awards – 22 and 23 August
Seventeen: Seventeen World Tour 'Ode To You' – 30–31 August and 1 September
 AB6IX: AB6IX 1st World Tour "6ixense" in Seoul – 9 and 10 November
 NU'EST: NU'EST 2019 Fanmeeting: L.O.Λ.E Page – 15, 16 and 17 November
 IU: 2019 IU Tour Concert "Love, Poem" – 23 and 24 November

2020
 BTS: BTS: Map of the Soul ON:E (Online) – 10 and 11 October

2021
 Twice: Twice 4th World Tour 'III' – 25 and 26 December

2022

 Street Woman Fighter: On The Stage Encore Concert – 1 and 2 January
 Universe: "UNI-KON" 2022 – 2 and 3 July
 The Boyz: The Boyz World Tour The-B Zone in Seoul Encore – 5, 6, and 7 August
 Girls' Generation: Special Event – Long Lasting Love – 3 September
 Stray Kids: 2nd World Tour "MANIAC" Seoul Special (Unveil 11) – 17 and 18 September
 2022 The Fact Music Awards – 8 October
 Blackpink: Born Pink World Tour – 15 and 16 October
 Treasure: Treasure Tour Hello  – 12 and 13 November
 g.o.d: 23th Anniversary Concert 2022 – 9, 10 and 11 December
 BTOB: BTOB 10th Anniversary Concert 2022 BTOB Time [Be Together] – 30, 31 December 2022 and 1 January 2023

2023
 32nd Seoul Music Awards – 19 January
 12th Circle Chart Music Awards – 18 February
 Conan Gray: Superache Tour – 28 February
 Seventeen: 2023 SVT 7th Fan Meeting <Seventeen in Carat Land> – 10, 11 and 12 March
 Harry Styles: Love On Tour – 20 March
 Tomorrow X Together: Act: Sweet Mirage – 25 and 26 March
 Red Velvet: Red Velvet 4th Concert "R to V" – 1 and 2 April
 Exo: 2023 EXO Fanmeeting "EXO' CLOCK" – 8 and 9 April
 Twice: Twice 5th World Tour 'Ready To Be – 15 and 16 April
 HYBE Labels: 2023 Weverse Con Festival – 10 and 11 June

See also
 List of indoor arenas in South Korea.

References

Indoor arenas in South Korea
Venues of the 1988 Summer Olympics
Olympic gymnastics venues
Sports venues in Seoul
Sports venues completed in 1986
Olympic Park, Seoul
Venues of the 1986 Asian Games
Asian Games badminton venues
1986 establishments in South Korea
Esports venues in South Korea
20th-century architecture in South Korea